The Democratic Party was a left liberal political party in the Netherlands. It was founded in 1921 by Jan Ernst Heeres when the Liberal Union, of which he was president, failed to merge with the Free-thinking Democratic League (VDB), and instead merged with the more conservative League of Free Liberals and Economic League.

At the party's first general election, the 1922 election, with Heeres leading the candidates list, it failed to attract enough votes for a seat in the House of Representatives. Its highest vote tally was at the 1925 election when it received 11,000 votes, which, at less than half a per cent of the total votes, was still insufficient to earn a seat. While members of the Democratic Party did manage to earn seats in the Provincial council and various city councils, it failed at the subsequent general elections in 1929. When Heeres died in 1932, the Democratic Party ceased to exist.

References

Sources
 
 

Defunct political parties in the Netherlands
Liberal parties in the Netherlands
Netherlands 1901
Social liberal parties
Political parties established in 1921
Political parties disestablished in 1932
1921 establishments in the Netherlands
Freethought organizations